Beverley Randolph Mason (1 September 1834–22 April 1910) was an American military officer and educator who was the founder and principal of the Gunston Hall School for young women in Washington, D.C. Mason was a great-grandson of George Mason, author of the Virginia Bill of Rights.

Early life and education
Mason was born at Okeley Manor in Fairfax County, Virginia on 1 September 1834. He was a son of Dr. Richard Chichester Mason and his wife Lucy Bolling Randolph.

American Civil War
At the onset of the American Civil War, Mason volunteered as a private in the Black Horse Cavalry of Fauquier County, Virginia. Soon afterward, Mason was detailed to act as commissary sergeant. Mason also efficiently supplied food to his command. He gained a captain's commission in the 4th Virginia Cavalry, and later a major's rank as assistant commissary in Fitzhugh Lee's division, where he was universally beloved and respected. Mason was made quartermaster in 1864.

Educator
A the close of the war, Major Mason engaged in business and as soon as the opportunity presented itself, he took up the profession of teaching. For a period of time after the war, Mason taught at the United States Military Academy in West Point, New York. Afterward, he returned Virginia, where in 1875, he married Elizabeth "Bettie" Harrison Nelson of Albemarle County. Mason then taught as a teacher in mathematics and Latin at the Norwood Institute.

Mason and his wife relocated to Washington, D.C. where they both engaged in teaching and founded a school for young ladies known as the Gunston Hall School, named for the homestead of his great-grandfather George Mason. Gunston Hall School was located at 3017 O Street, N.W. in a large yellow Georgetown mansion that was the former residence of Commodore Stephen Cassin, built in the early 19th century. Mason and his wife opened their school in the mansion in 1893 for their children and the children of their intimate friends. In 1905, Mason moved Gunston Hall School to a Colonial edifice at 1906 Florida Avenue near 19th and T Streets, N.W.

The Washington Post hailed Mason's Gunston Hall School as the "foremost among Washington's institutions for the education of girls and young ladies." Gunston Hall School continued as a flourishing boarding school for young women for 50 years. After its closure, the building housed Epiphany School, an Episcopal institution. The building is currently the home of the National Museum of American Jewish Military History. Mason's character impressed itself upon his students and his influence among them was widely felt and acknowledged by the students of successive years.

Marriage and children
Mason married Elizabeth "Bettie" Harrison Nelson, daughter of Keating Lewis Simmons Nelson and his wife Julia Ann Rogers, at St. Stephen's Church on 18 August 1875. The couple had six children:

Richard Nelson Mason (26 June 1876–22 November 1940)
Julia Nelson Mason Matthews (23 January 1878–27 December 1964)
Lucy Randolph Mason Moffett (31 January 1880–1 April 1965)
Margaret Thornton Mason (7 February 1882–February 1884)
Mary Wallace Mason Patchin (26 April 1884–28 August 1963)
Susan Josephine Beverley Mason Easley (17 January 1888–31 July 1962)

Death
Mason died on 22 April 1910 in Washington, D.C. at age 75. His funeral, which took place on Sunday afternoon, 24 April, at St. Margaret's Episcopal Church in Washington, D.C., was largely attended by his friends and pupils. Mason was interred after 24 April 1910 at Ivy Hill Cemetery in Alexandria, Virginia. In honor of their eminent comrade, the Robert E. Lee Camp of Confederate Veterans of Alexandria attended his burial in uniform. The Reverend Herbert Scott Smith and the Reverend Samuel A. Wallis conducted his services.

Ancestry

References

1834 births
1910 deaths
American educators
American Episcopalians
American planters
American school administrators
Burials at Ivy Hill Cemetery (Alexandria, Virginia)
Businesspeople from Virginia
Businesspeople from Washington, D.C.
Confederate States Army officers
Founders of schools in the United States
Mason family
People from Fairfax County, Virginia
People of Virginia in the American Civil War
American school principals
Virginia Democrats
Washington, D.C., Democrats
People from Dupont Circle